was a town located in Kitakatsushika District, Saitama Prefecture, Japan.

As of 2003, the town had an estimated population of 26,125 and a density of 1,655.58 persons per km2. The total area was 15.78 km2.

On March 23, 2010, Kurihashi, along with the town of Washimiya (also from Kitakatsushika District), and the town of Shōbu (from Minamisaitama District), was merged into the expanded city of Kuki.

References

Dissolved municipalities of Saitama Prefecture
Populated places disestablished in 2010
2010 disestablishments in Japan